Gílson Siqueira Nunes (born 12 June 1946) is a Brazilian football manager. He is known for his success with Brazil at youth level.

As a coach, he won the FIFA World Youth Championship in 1985 with Brazil.

He was also briefly the head coach of the Morocco and Costa Rica national teams in 1995 and 2000 respectively.

References 

1946 births
Living people
Brazilian footballers
Footballers from Rio de Janeiro (city)
Association football midfielders
Campeonato Brasileiro Série A players
Bonsucesso Futebol Clube players
Fluminense FC players
CR Vasco da Gama players
America Football Club (RJ) players
Brazilian football managers
Campeonato Brasileiro Série A managers
Al-Wasl F.C. managers
America Football Club (RJ) managers
Brazil national under-20 football team managers
Fluminense FC managers
Clube Náutico Capibaribe managers
Esporte Clube Bahia managers
São José Esporte Clube managers
Sport Club do Recife managers
Morocco national football team managers
Esporte Clube Juventude managers
Goiás Esporte Clube managers
Botafogo de Futebol e Regatas managers
Costa Rica national football team managers
Associação Portuguesa de Desportos managers
Al-Riyadh SC managers